Adventures in Perception is a 1971 Dutch short documentary film directed by Han Van Gelder. It was nominated for an Academy Award for Best Documentary Short., and won the Best Short Film on Art at the 1971 Cork Film Festival. It is a study on the works of M. C. Escher.

References

External links

1971 films
1971 documentary films
1971 short films
1970s Dutch-language films
Dutch short documentary films
1970s short documentary films
M. C. Escher
Documentary films about visual artists